Bertram Cooper Eardley (1879–1929) was an English footballer. He made 220 appearances (148 in the Football League) and scored 40 goals (14 in the Football League) for Port Vale over about ten seasons with the club. He established himself as a regular first team player, but had spells of inconsistency which left him out of the side for large periods. Ever the loyal Valiant, it is believed he did not join another team in 1907 when the club suffered financial meltdown and liquidation, instead he re-signed in December 1908 and went straight into the first team. He left for good in the summer of 1910.

Career
Eardley joined Burslem Port Vale in the summer of 1899, scoring on his debut on 10 February 1900 in a 1–1 draw with Luton Town at Dunstable Road. He did not feature again in the 1899–1900 season, though he did score seven goals in 30 games in 1900–01, including the only goal against Woolwich Arsenal at the Athletic Ground on the last day of the season. He played just seven Second Division games in 1901–02, before hitting seven goals in 25 league games in 1902–03. He played 37 league and cup games in 1903–04, scoring three goals. Eardley hit four goals in 19 appearances in 1904–05, before scoring just one goal in 17 appearances in 1905–06. He scored once in 30 games in 1906–07, and did not join another team in 1907 when the club suffered financial meltdown and liquidation. Instead he re-signed in December 1908 and went straight into the first team, before he left for good in the summer of 1910.

Career statistics
Source:

References

1879 births
1929 deaths
Sportspeople from Newcastle-under-Lyme
English footballers
Association football midfielders
Port Vale F.C. players
English Football League players